Pritzker School may refer to:

United States
Northwestern University Pritzker School of Law
Pritzker College Prep, a public charter high school in Chicago
Pritzker School, a public K–8 school in Chicago
Pritzker School of Medicine, the medical school at The University of Chicago
Pritzker School of Molecular Engineering at the University of Chicago